Ericeia is a genus of moths in the family Erebidae. The genus was erected by Francis Walker in 1858.

Species
 Ericeia albangula (Saalmüller, 1880)
 Ericeia amanda (Walker, 1858)
 Ericeia amplipennis Prout, 1922
 Ericeia biplagiella Viette, 1966
 Ericeia brunneistriga (Bethune-Baker, 1906)
 Ericeia brunnescens (Snellen, 1880)
 Ericeia canipuncta Prout, 1929
 Ericeia congregata (Walker, 1858)
 Ericeia congressa (Walker, 1858)
 Ericeia dysmorpha Prout, 1929
 Ericeia elongata Prout, 1929
 Ericeia epitheca Swinhoe, 1915
 Ericeia eriophora (Guenee, 1852)
 Ericeia fraterna (Moore, 1885)
 Ericeia goniosema Hampson, 1922
 Ericeia hirsutitarsus Holloway, 1977
 Ericeia inangulata Guenée, 1852
 Ericeia korintjiensis Prout, 1928
 Ericeia leichardtii (Koch, 1865)
 Ericeia lituraria (Saalmüller, 1880)
 Ericeia pallidula Prout, 1929
 Ericeia pertendens Walker, 1858
 Ericeia plaesiodes Turner, 1932
 Ericeia rectifascia Prout, 1928
 Ericeia rectimargo Prout, 1929
 Ericeia rhanteria Bethune-Baker, 1914
 Ericeia setosipedes Bethune-Baker, 1914
 Ericeia sobria Walker, [1858]
 Ericeia subsignata Walker, [1858]

Former species
 Ericeia aliena (Walker, 1858)
 Ericeia certilinea Prout, 1929
 Ericeia euryptera Prout, 1929
 Ericeia intextilia (Schultze, 1908)
 Ericeia waterstoni Wiltshire, 1982

References

External links
 
 
 
 "Ericeia Walker". The Moths of Borneo. Retrieved September 28, 2018.

 
Hulodini
Moth genera